The collared brushturkey, brown-collared brushturkey, or red-legged brushturkey (Talegalla jobiensis) is a species of bird in the family Megapodiidae.
It is found in the northern part of New Guinea.
Its natural habitats are subtropical or tropical moist lowland forest and subtropical or tropical moist montane forest.

References

collared brushturkey
collared brushturkey
Taxonomy articles created by Polbot